Gidugu Rudra Raju is an Indian politician who is serving as President of Andhra Pradesh Congress Committee and served as Member of Andhra Pradesh Legislative Council. He also served as All India Congress Committee Secretary incharge of Odisha. After taking charge as the PCC President, there is new enthusiasm in the party cadres.

References 

Indian politicians
Members of the Andhra Pradesh Legislative Council
Living people
1969 births